Valéry Aubertin (born 3 June 1970) is a contemporary French organist, composer and choir conductor.

Biography 
Born in Lagny-sur-Marne, Aubertin was a student in the organ class of Michèle Guyard at the Aubervilliers conservatory. He ended his studies with a First Prize of organ and another first prize of music formation.

From 1989 to 1995, he attended the Conservatoire de Paris where he won several first prizes. Among others, he was a student of Brigitte François-Sappey (history of music and orchestration), and Gérard Grisey (musical composition).

From 1995 to 1997, he worked with Jean-Louis Florentz (composition). 
In 1995, his first symphonic work ...et le soleil se déchirait, Op.7 received, unanimously by the jury and ahead of 216 entries from all over the world, the First Prize of the 40th International Composition Competition of the City of Trieste, 32nd symphonic edition (Trieste, Italy 1995).

He is a professor of musical analysis, musical training and composition at the Conservatoire à rayonnement départemental du Val Maubuée.

Valéry Aubertin was organist at the Saint-Denis church in Quincy-Voisins from 1989 to 2011. He is the choir director of the "Ensemble Vocale Anguelos", located in this very city.

Principal works 
 Works for organ
 Le Livre Ouvert, for organ (15 pieces of various sizes) 
 Miserere
 Triptyque pénitentiel
 Passion
 Te lucis ante terminum
 Lunaire
 Variations
 Improvisation - Kandinsky 1914
 Sonatine pour les étoiles
 Vincent van Gogh - Les Fresques - Lamento, symphonic poem
 Cadran lunaire
 La Nuit des Nuits
 Liebeslied
 Le Temps déborde
 La Nuit remue
 In n'y a plus de profondeur ni de surface
 Six notations, for organ (1991–92)
 2e Livre d'Orgue composed of four sonatas. These four sonatas are structured in several movements with strong logical and poetic links between them. 
 1st Sonata
 2nd Sonata
 3rd Sonata
 4th Sonata. This sonata is inspired by different episodes of Dante's Divine Comedy. It is thus articulated in three movements: Hell (subdivided into four parts), Purgatory (subdivided into two parts) and, in conclusion, Paradise. 
 Ma l'ombra sol.
 Trois études
 Unruhe
 Passage de l'oubli
 5th Sonata
 Instrumental works 
 Livre pour guitare
 Seuil 
 1st Sonata
 2nd Sonata
 Ausklang 
 Sonata for clarinet and piano.
 Études-tableaux for piano
 La nuit incandescente for piano
 Da flogen wir for violin
 Vocal works
 Missa brevis pro defunctis poetis
 Madrigali
 Stabat Mater
 Dialogue du silence avec le silence
 Ornières
 Vent nocturne
 Office secret
 Élégie de Ronsard
 Symphonic works 
 Et le soleil se déchirait, 22 pieces for orchestra, which in 1995 won first prize at the International Composition Competition of Trieste in Italy.
 Une Aurore
 Lever du Jour
 Quatre bagatelles
 Symphonie I, for 10 instruments

Valéry Aubertin's works are available in the following publishing houses: Billaudot, Chanteloup-Musique and Europart.

Sources 
 Heddo Heide, Orgelmusik auf neuen Pfaden, in "Ars Organi" - 2005, Josefstraße 8, 66693 Mettlach, Germany.
 Éric Lebrun, article about Valéry Aubertin, in Guide de la musique d'orgue, under the direction of Gilles Cantagrel, Fayard - 2012
 [https://www.worldcat.org/oclc/498938372 Être compositeur, être compositrice en France au XXIe], Éric Tissier, L'Harmattan, Paris, 2009.

References

External links 
 Valéry Aubertin on WorldCat identities
 Valéry Aubertin joue ses œuvres pour orgue à Notre-Dame de Gray on ResMusica
 Official website
 Éveil on data.bnf.fr
 Daria Burlak - Valéry Aubertin, 2ème Livre d'Orgue, Première Sonate on YouTube

20th-century French composers
21st-century French composers
French classical organists
French male organists
French composers of sacred music
French choral conductors
French male conductors (music)
1970 births
People from Lagny-sur-Marne
Living people
Conservatoire de Paris alumni
20th-century French conductors (music)
21st-century French conductors (music)
21st-century organists
20th-century French male musicians
21st-century French male musicians
Male classical organists